Charles Joseph Fleischmann (born October 11, 1962) is an American attorney and politician who has been the U.S. representative for  since 2011. The district is based in Chattanooga and includes a large part of East Tennessee, including Oak Ridge. He is a member of the Republican Party.

Early life, education, and law career 
Fleischmann was born in Manhattan, New York City, and is a resident of Ooltewah, an unincorporated suburban community east of Chattanooga. He is the son of Rose Marie (née Salvo) and Max Fleischmann, Jr. Fleischmann is of Italian, English, and Austro-Hungarian descent, and is a distant relative of Harry Houdini.

Fleischmann graduated from Elk Grove High School in Elk Grove Village, Illinois. He received a Bachelor of Arts degree in political science at the University of Illinois at Urbana–Champaign. He received both Phi Beta Kappa and magna cum laude honors. He then earned a Juris Doctor from the University of Tennessee College of Law in Knoxville. He was the first member of his family to attend college.

Early career 

Afrer graduating from law school, Fleischmann moved to Chattanooga, Tennessee, and founded an independent law firm, Fleischmann and Fleischmann, in 1987. He is a former president of the Chattanooga Bar Association and former chair of the Chattanooga Lawyers Pro Bono Committee.

U.S. House of Representatives

Elections
2010

Republican incumbent Zach Wamp retired in order to run for governor, leaving this an open seat. Fleischmann entered an 11-way Republican primary—the real contest in this heavily Republican district. None of the candidates had ever run for elected office before. Fleischmann's biggest competition came from former state GOP chair Robin Smith, who was considered the front-runner. She was endorsed by former Speaker of the U.S. House Newt Gingrich and The Club for Growth. Fleischmann won the primary with a plurality of 30% of the vote, defeating Smith by 1,415 votes. He won most of the counties in the district, which were mostly in the northern part of the district, while Smith won three counties: Rhea, Hamilton (home to Chattanooga), and Polk counties. Third-place finisher Tim Gobble won only Bradley County, his home county.

Fleischmann's Democratic opponent in the general election was John Wolfe, a fellow attorney. Fleischmann had faced Wolfe in his first case as an attorney. He said he won that case and the appeal "and now I want to defeat him a third time." His other opponent was independent candidate Savas Kyriakidis, an attorney, restaurant owner and Iraq War veteran. Fleischmann won the race with 57% of the vote.

2012

In his first reelection campaign, Fleischmann defeated Scottie Mayfield and Weston Wamp in the Republican primary, 39%-31%-29%. He defeated Democratic nominee Mary Headrick in the general election with a large majority of the vote.

2014

On November 4, 2014, Fleischmann defeated Headrick again with 62.3% of the vote.

2016

On November 8, 2016, Fleischmann defeated Democrat Melody Shekari and independent Rick Tyler with 66.4% of the vote.

2018

On November 6, 2018, Fleischmann defeated Democrat Danielle Mitchell and independent Rick Tyler with 63.7% of the vote.

2020

On November 3, 2020, Fleischmann defeated Democrat Meg Gorman with 67.3% of the vote.

Tenure

Fleischmann has been a firm opponent of gun control. He has received an "A" rating from the interest groups "National Rifle Association Political Fund Positions on Gun Rights" and "Gun Owners of America Positions on Gun Rights". He supports legislation that "allows licensed firearm owners to carry out their God-given right more freely" because "the right to carry a firearm is a right that allows law-abiding citizens to protect themselves and is crucial to the freedom of our country." On November 16, 2011, Fleischmann voted for the National Right-to-Carry Reciprocity Act of 2011, which would allow a resident of a state that allows concealed carry to possess a firearm while visiting another state that has different firearm laws.

Fleischmann's first vote in office was for the 2011 motion Repealing the Health Care Bill.

In July 2011, Fleischmann originally supported Speaker John Boehner's debt limit bill, but voted against the final debt ceiling agreement.

On November 16, 2011, Fleischmann voted for a bill that encourages the display of "In God We Trust" in public buildings and schools and reinforces it as the motto of the United States.

In November 2011, Fleischmann filed a new bill, the Stop Green Initiative Abuse Act of 2011, which would repeal the Department of Energy's Weatherization Assistance Program. This program attempts to assist low-income families in lowering their energy bills by adding energy-efficient caulking and insulation to homes. A December 2010 Tennessee Comptroller's Office report concluded that funds for the program had been "wasted or misspent". Fleischmann's office estimated that if this bill passed it would save taxpayers $2.1 billion over the next decade. This was the third bill he proposed.

In December 2020, Fleischmann was one of 126 Republican members of the House of Representatives to sign an amicus brief in support of Texas v. Pennsylvania, a lawsuit filed at the United States Supreme Court contesting the results of the 2020 presidential election, in which Joe Biden defeated incumbent Donald Trump. The Supreme Court declined to hear the case on the basis that Texas lacked standing under Article III of the Constitution to challenge the results of an election held by another state.

House Speaker Nancy Pelosi issued a statement that called signing the amicus brief an act of "election subversion." She also reprimanded Fleischmann and the other House members who supported the lawsuit: "The 126 Republican Members that signed onto this lawsuit brought dishonor to the House. Instead of upholding their oath to support and defend the Constitution, they chose to subvert the Constitution and undermine public trust in our sacred democratic institutions." New Jersey Representative Bill Pascrell, citing section three of the 14th Amendment, called for Pelosi to not seat Fleischmann and the other Republicans who signed the brief supporting the suit, arguing that "the text of the 14th Amendment expressly forbids Members of Congress from engaging in rebellion against the United States. Trying to overturn a democratic election and install a dictator seems like a pretty clear example of that."

Fleischmann supports the use of nuclear power. His district contains the Sequoyah Nuclear Plant. He is the head of the House Nuclear Cleanup Caucus.

Committee assignments
 Committee on Appropriations
Subcommittee on Energy and Water Appropriations
 Subcommittee on Homeland Security (Ranking Member)

Caucus memberships
 United States Congressional International Conservation Caucus
 U.S.-Japan Caucus
Republican Study Committee

Electoral history

Personal life
Fleischmann was diagnosed with COVID-19 on January 10, 2021.

Fleischmann is married to Brenda M. Fleischmann. They have three sons, and live in Ooltewah. Fleischmann is a Roman Catholic.

References

External links
 Congressman Chuck Fleischmann official U.S. House website
 Chuck Fleischmann for Congress
 
 
 
Articles
 "Fleischmann Introduces Bill To Terminate Government Weatherization Program"
 "Boehner Struggles for Votes"

|-

1962 births
21st-century American politicians
American gun rights activists
American people of Italian descent
American people of Austrian-Jewish descent
American people of English descent
American people of Hungarian-Jewish descent
American Roman Catholics
Catholics from Tennessee
Living people
People from Ooltewah, Tennessee
Politicians from Chattanooga, Tennessee
Politicians from Manhattan
Tennessee lawyers
Republican Party members of the United States House of Representatives from Tennessee
University of Illinois Urbana-Champaign alumni
University of Tennessee College of Law alumni